Sutton Township may refer to one of the following places in the United States:

 Sutton Township, Clay County, Nebraska
 Sutton Township, Meigs County, Ohio
 Sutton Township, Muskogee County, Oklahoma

See also
 Suttons Bay Township, Michigan
 Sutton (disambiguation)

Township name disambiguation pages